Ansac-sur-Vienne (literally Ansac on Vienne) is a commune in the Charente department in Southwestern France.

Population

See also
Communes of the Charente department

References

Communes of Charente